Klosterstræde 23 is a Neoclassical property in the Old Town of Copenhagen, Denmark. The building is located opposite Gråbrødrestræde, a short street linking Klosterstræde with Gråbrødretorv. The building was listed on the Danish registry of protected buildings and places in 1950.

History
Peter Christian Weinreich Fischer (1772–1834) established a glazier's business at an adjacent site on 20 June 1796. The two properties at Klosterstræde 23 and Klosterstræde 21 were constructed for him in 1811–12 and 1814–17. He subsequently ran his glazier's business, which would later be continued by his son, Peter Didrik Weinreich Fischer (1813–1884), from No. 21. 

The military officer Christian de Meza (1792–1865), then an artillery captain, was a resident in the building from 1722 to 1824. C. H. Visby (1801–1870), a clergy, was a resident in the building in 1827–28. Gottlieb Siesbye (1803–1884), a journalist and editor, was a resident in the building from 1873 to 1877.

Architecture
 
Klosterstræde 23 is a four-storey, four-winged complex built in red brick. The main wing towards the street is 10 bays wide and is constructed with projecting layers of mortar between the bricks (Danish: ''Hamburgfuge).

The main entrance is topped by a triangular pediment. The façade is finished by a cornice supported by corbels. The roof is clad with red tiles.

The main wing and part of the two side wings contain two large apartments on each floor. The rear wing and bottom part of the two side wings contain two somewhat smaller apartments on each floor. The two halves of each side wing are separated by staircases.

References

External links
 Bæst Cocktail Bar

Listed residential buildings in Copenhagen
Buildings and structures completed in 1821
1912 establishments in Denmark.